"You Don't Have to Worry" is a song by American R&B singer Mary J. Blige. It was written by Kenny Greene and Edward "DJ Eddie F" Ferrell  for the soundtrack of the film Who's the Man? (1993), while production was helmed by Ferrell, with co-production from Kenny "K-Smoove" Kornegay and Darin "Piano Man" Whittington. It contains a sample of "Papa Don't Take No Mess" by James Brown. Released as a single, it charted on the US Billboard Hot 100, peaking at number 63, while reaching number 11 on the Billboard Hot R&B/Hip-Hop Songs. A remix version featuring rapper Craig Mack was produced by Sean "Puffy" Combs and Tony Dofat and later included on Blige's remix album, What's the 411? Remix (1993).

Critical reception
In 2013, the original version of "You Don't Have to Worry" placed 20th on Complex magazine's "50 Best R&B Songs That Flipped Rap Beats", while its remix version with Craig Mack ranked 33rd on the list.

Music video
The music video for "You Don't Have to Worry" was directed by American film director, film producer, and music video director F. Gary Gray and filmed at various locations in New York City in the summer of 1993. It depicts Blige performing in a jersey with a New York Yankees cap and baggy jeans, also  wearing an all denim suit with matching boots performing on top of a car in front of a large crowd, as well her wearing an orange jacket. The song's original version, which appears in the video, has a slightly alternate difference towards the one on the soundtrack: Blige's vocals throughout the song is multitracked, and the backing vocals are omitted.

Tracklisting

U.S. Cassette single
 "You Don't Have to Worry" (Album Radio Mix) – 4:05
 "You Don't Have to Worry" (Remix Main with Rap) – 5:18

U.S. 12" single
 "You Don't Have to Worry" (Album Radio Mix) – 4:05
 "You Don't Have to Worry" (Radio Mix with Clean Rap) – 4:35
 "You Don't Have to Worry" (Remix Main with Rap) – 5:18

U.K. CD single
 "You Don't Have to Worry" (Album Radio Remix) – 4:05
 "You Don't Have to Worry" (Radio Remix with Clean Rap) – 4:35
 "You Don't Have to Worry" (Remix Main with Rap) – 5:18
 "You Don't Have to Worry" (Album Radio Remix Instrumental) – 4:05

U.K. 12" single
 "You Don't Have to Worry" (Remix Main with Rap) – 5:18
 "You Don't Have to Worry" (Album Radio Remix) – 4:05
 "You Don't Have to Worry" (Radio Remix with Clean Rap) – 4:35
 "You Don't Have to Worry" (Album Radio Remix Instrumental) – 4:05

Charts

Release history

References

Mary J. Blige songs
1993 singles
1993 songs
MCA Records singles
Music videos directed by F. Gary Gray
Songs written by Kenny Greene
Uptown Records singles